Conquering Dystopia is an American instrumental technical death metal supergroup founded by solo guitarist Keith Merrow and Arch Enemy guitarist Jeff Loomis.

History 
In early 2013 solo guitarist Keith Merrow announced via his Facebook page that he and former Nevermore guitarist Jeff Loomis would record an album together. In July 2013 Merrow and Loomis, now going by the name Conquering Dystopia, launched a crowdfunding campaign on Indiegogo in order to fund the recording of the album and also announced that the band's lineup would also feature Cannibal Corpse bassist Alex Webster and former The Faceless drummer Alex Rüdinger. The campaign goal of $15,000 was reached in less than 24 hours.

In December 2013 Conquering Dystopia recorded their self-titled album at the Audio Hammer Studios with producer Mark Lewis. On March 10, 2014, the band digitally released the album.

Conquering Dystopia embarked on a tour alongside Animals as Leaders and Chon during the spring and summer of 2014.

On July 8, 2014 Conquering Dystopia was made available on vinyl and released via Century Media Records.

Members 
 Jeff Loomis – guitar (2013–present)
 Keith Merrow – guitar (2013–present)
 Alex Webster – bass (2013–present)
 Alex Rüdinger – drums (2013–present)

Discography 
 Conquering Dystopia (2014)

Personnel 

 Keith Merrow – Producer, Engineer
 Mark Lewis – Engineer, Mixer, Mastering
 Chris Finster – Engineer

References

External links 
 
 

American technical death metal musical groups
American progressive metal musical groups
American instrumental musical groups
Heavy metal supergroups
Musical groups established in 2013
Musical quartets
2013 establishments in the United States